Meriones may refer to:

Meriones (mythology), a hero of the Trojan War
Meriones (genus), a genus of gerbil that includes the species most commonly kept as a pet
Meriones (subgenus) a subgenus of the genus Meriones that contains a single species: the Tamarisk Jird
3596 Meriones, a Trojan asteroid